Manuel Fernández Mora (10 October 1932 – 1 January 2017), known as Moruca, was a Spanish professional football forward and manager.

Playing career
Born in Vargas, Cantabria, Moruca started playing with Rayo Cantabria who acted as farm team to Racing de Santander. On 25 March 1951 he took part in his first and only La Liga match with the latter side, in a 1–2 away loss against RCD Español.

At the professional level, Moruca also appeared for SD Eibar in Segunda División. He also represented Real Betis, retiring in 1956 at the age of 24 with his first club Rayo Cantabria.

Coaching career
After working with CA Osasuna, Gimnástica de Torrelavega and Barakaldo CF, promoting the latter to the second level in 1977, Moruca returned to Racing on a permanent basis in 1969–70 – he had already acted as interim manager six seasons before. He achieved promotion from Tercera División that year and, in 1981, with him still in charge, they reached the top flight for the first time ever with a team composed mainly of local players.

Moruca went on to rank second in Racing's all-time list of managers with most games, only behind José María Maguregui.

References

External links

1932 births
2017 deaths
Spanish footballers
Footballers from Cantabria
Association football forwards
La Liga players
Segunda División players
Tercera División players
Rayo Cantabria players
Racing de Santander players
Real Betis players
SD Eibar footballers
Spanish football managers
La Liga managers
Segunda División managers
Racing de Santander managers
CA Osasuna managers
Gimnástica de Torrelavega managers
Barakaldo CF managers
Elche CF managers